Kowloon Walled City is an upcoming Hong Kong martial arts film directed by Cheang Pou-soi and starring Louis Koo, Sammo Hung, Richie Jen and Raymond Lam. The film is an adaptation of the manhua City of Darkness by Andy Seto.

Having been in development since the 2000s, production for the film officially began on 22 November 2021.

Cast
Louis Koo as Tornado (龍捲風), a martial arts master who is regarded as a legend among the Kowloon Walled City.
Sammo Hung
Richie Jen
Raymond Lam
Terrence Lau
Kenny Wong
Tony Wu
German Cheung
Philip Ng
Tommy Chu
Chung Suet-ying

Production
The project had been in development since the 2000s, where it was set to be co-directed by John Woo and Johnnie To and star an all-star cast of Chow Yun-fat, Andy Lau, Tony Leung, Sean Lau, Louis Koo, Anthony Wong, Sun Honglei, Anita Yuen and Zhang Jingchu, with Nicolas Cage, James McAvoy, Li Baotian, Jang Dong-gun, Li Bingbing and Zhang Fengyi making special appearances, as shown on a teaser poster although nothing was confirmed.

On 13 April 2013, Media Asia announced the project was to be titled Dragon City and set to be directed by Derek Kwok and starring Donnie Yen, who would also serve as action director and producer through his production company, Super Hero Films, and was set to begin production in September of that year.

After seemingly stuck in development hell for several years, Media Asia once again announced the project on 28 February 2021, with Cheang Pou-soi set to direct while Koo, Richie Jen and Zhang Jin are set to star. Principal photography Kowloon Walled City officially began on 22 November 2021, which was revealed when the in a post on the film's official Facebook page although the cast was not revealed yet until the film held its production commencement ceremony on 30 November, which was attended by Cheang, producers John Chong and Wilson Yip and cast members Koo, Sammo Hung, Jen, Raymond Lam, Terrence Lau, Kenny Wong, Tony Wu, German Cheung, Philip Ng, Tommy Chu and Chung Suet-ying. There, Koo reveals that two replica sets of the Kowloon Walled City was built for filming while actual magazines, record albums, televisions and commercials from the 1980s will be used as props. All the main cast spent a year training to prepare for the film's fight scenes.

See also
Sammo Hung filmography

References

Upcoming films
2020s martial arts films
2020s action thriller films
Hong Kong martial arts films
Hong Kong action thriller films
Kung fu films
Films directed by Cheang Pou-soi
Cantonese-language films
Media Asia films
Films set in the 1980s
Films set in Hong Kong
Films shot in Hong Kong
Films based on Hong Kong comics
Live-action films based on comics